Prostitution in Kuwait is illegal, but common. Most of the prostitutes are foreign nationals. 

Law enforcement usually deports prostitutes or makes them sign a "good conduct pledge" before release. Those running prostitution rings normally receive jail sentences. There are allegations that some police received bribes from brothels and warn them of upcoming raids.

Different nationalities of prostitutes and their controlling pimps tend to be found in different areas. Filipinos in Ahmadi Governorate, Ethiopians in Hawalli Governorate,  and Indians, Sri Lankans and Bangladeshis in Farwaniya Governorate and part of Salmiya. Indians and Chinese work the malls in Salmiya. There are also Arab and European prostitutes in the country.

Brothels are known to exist in Al Jahra, Hawalli, Jleeb Al-Shuyoukh, Salmiya, Fahaheel, Fintas and Jabriya.

Sex trafficking

Kuwait is a destination country for men and women subjected to forced prostitution. Kuwait's sponsorship law—which ties a migrant worker's legal residence and valid immigration status to an employer, restricts workers’ movements and penalises them for leaving abusive workplaces. Sources report runaway domestic workers are sometimes exploited in forced prostitution by agents or criminals, who manipulate their illegal status.

In 2016, the government investigated six potential sex trafficking cases and prosecuted 15 suspects, compared to six cases investigated and 20 suspects prosecuted during the previous reporting period. Seven prosecutions from 2015 remained pending at the close of the reporting year. The government achieved nine convictions, including one Kuwaiti citizen—under the anti-trafficking law, on par with eight convictions the previous year; five accused traffickers were acquitted.

The United States Department of State Office to Monitor and Combat Trafficking in Persons ranks Kuwait as a 'Tier 2 Watch List' country.

External links
Kuwait arrests 150 prostitutes
Bawdy blasphemers arrested in Ramadan sex scandal

References

Kuwait
Society of Kuwait
Law of Kuwait
Women's rights in Kuwait
Kuwait
Social issues in Kuwait